Vasyl Karlovych Rats (born 25 March 1961) is a Ukrainian former football midfielder. He participated in two World Cups with the Soviet Union national football team.

Club career
Rats played several seasons with FC Dynamo Kyiv, where he won the Soviet Top League three times.

International career
Rats earned 47 caps and scored 4 goals for the USSR, from 1986 to 1990. He played in two World Cups, in 1986 and 1990. In the 1986 World Cup he scored a goal with a 27-meter shot against France in a 1–1 draw in the first round: a headed clearance by France was picked up by Ihor Belanov and laid off to Rats, who on the first touch, struck the ball powerfully from several yards outside the area past French goalkeeper Joël Bats and into the top left corner of the net. During Euro 1988 his goal secured USSR a 1–0 victory in the group stage over eventual champions The Netherlands. USSR reached the final, but were unable to repeat their achievement in the group stage and lost 2–0.

Honours
 Soviet Top League: 1985, 1986, 1990
 Soviet Cup: 1982, 1987, 1990
 UEFA Cup Winners' Cup: 1986
 UEFA Euro 1988 Runner-up: 1988

References

1961 births
Living people
Ukrainian people of Hungarian descent
Soviet footballers
Soviet expatriate footballers
Ukrainian footballers
Ukrainian expatriate footballers
Expatriate footballers in Spain
Expatriate footballers in Hungary
Ukrainian football managers
FC Nyva Vinnytsia players
FC Dynamo Kyiv players
FC Karpaty Lviv players
La Liga players
RCD Espanyol footballers
Ferencvárosi TC footballers
1986 FIFA World Cup players
UEFA Euro 1988 players
1990 FIFA World Cup players
Soviet Union international footballers
Soviet Top League players
Ukrainian Premier League managers
Soviet expatriate sportspeople in Spain
Soviet expatriate sportspeople in Hungary
Ukrainian expatriate sportspeople in Hungary
FC Obolon Kyiv managers
Soviet people of Hungarian descent
Association football midfielders
Recipients of the Order of Merit (Ukraine), 3rd class
Sportspeople from Zakarpattia Oblast